A declaration of independence is an assertion of the independence of an aspiring state or states.

Declaration of Independence may also refer to:
Declaration of Independence (Trumbull), 1817–18 painting by John Trumbull
Declaration of Independence (film), 1938 American short drama film 
Declaration of Independence (EP), 2011 EP by alternative rock band No Americana
Declaration of Independence (album), 2012 album by American country rap artist Colt Ford

See also
 United States Declaration of Independence
 Mecklenburg Declaration of Independence 
 Unilateral declaration of independence